Sarah Borwell and Raquel Kops-Jones were the defending champions. They both participated, but competed with different partners. Borwell played alongside Melanie South, while Kops-Jones decided to play with Abigail Spears.
Kimiko Date-Krumm and Zhang Shuai won the final against Kops-Jones and Spears 6–4, 7–6(7).

Seeds

Draw

Draw

References
 Doubles Draw

Aegon Trophy - Doubles
2011 Women's Doubles